Chalga (often referred to as pop-folk, short for "popular folk" or ethno-pop, short for "ethnic pop") is a Bulgarian music genre. Chalga or pop-folk is essentially a folk-inspired dance music genre, with a blend of Bulgarian music (Bulgarian ethno-pop genre) and also primary influences from Greek, Turkish and Arabic.

History
The name Chalga is derived from the Turkish word Çalgı, meaning "musical instrument".

Current Chalga music didn't emerge until 1989 with the collapse of communist rule. The people began to rejoice that the restrictions over what to listen to had vanished, thus Chalga took off. There were critics who complained that Chalga was only about corruption, easy money, and indiscriminate sex, but many "ordinary" people have embraced it due of their new freedom as their alternative to officialdom.

Throughout the Balkans, folk traditions have seen a process of modernization. In Greece, there are similarities with Laiko Greek music. The eastern music of Byzantine tradition in history, became very close to early Bulgarian Chalga music.

In Turkey, Arabesque music, with similar "popular" elements was developed, taking Turkish music elements and lyrics and mixing it more with Arab influences due to religious similarities, with Arabesque becoming increasingly popular since the 1960s and has now become part of Turkish music as well.

Whilst in the People's Republic of Bulgaria, Chalga was forbidden by the ruling Communist governments. Todor Zhivkov, the last communist leader of Bulgaria, took a more nationalistic stance in the 1980s, considering Chalga music tradition as inferior to purely Slavic roots music. Chalga often came with a provocative hip-shaking dance and at times lewd sexual lyrics, so it was also considered inappropriate from a moral standpoint. While discouraged in Bulgaria, and not played on official radio stations, a similar type of music called Turbofolk in neighboring SFR Yugoslavia was met with less restriction by the Yugoslav official media.

1990s onwards: Surge in popularity
In 1989, when the communism fell, restrictions on broadcasting Chalga or Pop-folk music were lifted. A new generation of musicians adopted the genre and grabbed the public spotlight, performing daring and overtly sexual songs not allowed earlier. Pop-folk also infiltrated the mass media with a string of controversial sensational coverage. Though it was still widely considered "degenerate" and "low level" music, it managed to gain popularity in the following decade. In the first years of the rise of Chalga, the melodies were influenced by Arabic, Turkish and Greek folk music featuring instruments such as zurna, clarinet, accordion and buzuki. The early Pop-folk divas and "kings", such as Toni Dacheva and Boni- singers of Kristal Orchestra - Gloria, Valdes, Rado Shisharkata and Sasho Roman, opened the way for uprising stars such as Sashka Vaseva, Desi Slava, Ivana, Kamelia, Reni, Extra Nina, Tsvetelina, Vesela, Joro Lyubimetsa. Although, some had only several years of success, many of the stars of the early Pop-folk years became icons for the genre. Several recording studios such as Payner Music and ARA Music, pumped out a steady stream of tracks every week on dedicated TV channels.

By the 2000s, Chalga's popularity greatly increased, in far greater proportion to its neighboring popular traditions of Serbian Turbo-folk or Greek Laïko. The processes of liberalisation in the country allowed the Chalga genre to deal openly with more provocative displays of sex, money, as well as profanity in general similar in attitude to the rap or hip-hop music videos. The early years of the 21st century gave rise to the star of Azis in the Bulgarian musical scene. His provocative and inappropriate public displays of nudity and homosexuality along with the vulgar lyrics of some of his songs and his flamboyant clothing played a great role in controversially popularizing the genre internationally as a typical Bulgarian music. His shocking public behaviour and announcements, alongside his undisputed musical talent boosted his fame and he is considered by many to be the king of the Chalga genre. However, constant competition among for media attention singers and reliance on displays of sex, drugs and the use of vulgar language has left the public with negative attitude towards the genre. A particular example of inadequacy in seeking commercial success is the incorporation of the anthem of the Bulgarian army into a song.

Other competing styles made efforts to create fusion using Chalga elements in rap and hip hop music, represented by artists and groups like Ustata, by acts like Dope Reach Squad, and Mangasarian Bros.

Today Pop-folk record companies collaborate with various partners, mainly from other Balkan countries, giving in to the popular world trends of RnB and hip-hop, as well as dance, techno, house, trap music and even dubstep, dub, EDM and drum and bass, making this type of music having a more widespread popularity abroad.

Criticism
Chalga has become popular in "Chalga dance clubs" and Chalga-oriented pubs or bars. Most Chalga clubs or Pop-folk clubs are called 'дискотека' (discotheque). Chalga clubs are sometimes the most busy venues in Sofia and touristic venues. But this apparent success and upsurge in popularity has invited great controversy about Chalga and its quick proliferation and has led to some musical and linguistic research, critical study, and heated public discussions about the subject.

Chalga proponents often claim Chalga or Pop-folk is the new Bulgarian folk music, but critics have demonstrated that it lacks connection to any indigenous music traditions and that its origins are largely Middle Eastern. Nevertheless, the Chalga industry promotes Chalga as having Bulgarian-roots to the local population and to tourists, with the latter accepting it as a novel approach to Balkan pop.

Chalga is often criticized for its "tawdriness", "loose morals", its "disconnection from Bulgarian music tradition"s (i.e. its Middle Eastern, Arabic, Arabesque roots), and its sexually explicit lyrics. In addition, the Chalga industry has been criticized for "exploiting women and degrading them through sexism".

Chalga music videos often feature a wealthy man who spends money on promiscuous women and insinuate that they engage in indiscriminate sexual acts. Chalga lyrics focus predominantly on sexual intercourse, promiscuous behavior, sexism, and corruption.

Chalga venues are largely criticized for not regulating entry by underage individuals and for failing to protect its customers from sexual assault by promoting sexual interactions. Chalga venues also do not regulate distribution of illicit drugs and are related to smuggling and drug-trafficking. Some artists, performers, and musicians shun the Chalga industry for undermining music creativity by encouraging formulaic and predictable music, plagiarism, and lewd lyrics.

In addition, many Chalga critics claim the genre is made predominately for the minority Gypsy people.

There has been a long, intensive and very hostile rivalry between Chalga fans (or 'chalgadzii') and heavy metal fans (or metalheads) in Bulgaria, due to genre and their respective subculture differences. Bulgarian metalheads tend to oppose Chalga due to its 'ethnic backwardness', proving that 'capitalism is only another modernist lie'.

Lyrics and music videos
Modern-day Chalga or pop-folk lyrics and music videos have overwhelmingly liberal sexual content. The texts and/or lyrics, although sung primarily in Bulgarian, can be sung interchangeably in many languages and Bulgarian Chalga or Bulgarian Pop-folk have been subject of covers in a multiple of languages. But even in Bulgarian Chalga, sometimes especially in duet with foreign singer the actual Chalga song lyrics do contain a mixture of many languages – Bulgarian often mixed with some lyrics in  Serbian, Albanian, Turkish, Romani, Greek, Persian, Romanian, Arabic and more recently with some lyrics in English, Russian, French, Spanish, Italian and German.

Because of its appeal and thanks to Bulgarian music television channels like Balkanika TV, Fan TV and Planeta TV, Chalga has become popular in neighboring countries, notably North Macedonia, Greece, Romania, Albania, Serbia, and to lesser extent in Russia, Ukraine and Moldova.

Popular singers

See also
Byzantine music
Arabesque (Turkish music)
Laïko
Manele
Skiladiko
Turbo-folk
Music of Lebanon
Arabic pop music
Mizrahi music
Tallava
Čalgija
Disco polo
Eurodance
Music of Lebanon
Arabic music

Notes

References
 The  phenomenon of chalga  in modern Bulgarian folk by Milena Droumeva
 Claire Levy, "Who is the "Other" in Balkans?" in [ Music popular culture identities], Rodopi, 2002, p. 215
 Седемте гряха на чалгата. Към антропология на етнопопмузиката, Розмари Стателова,  (in Bulgarian) (translation of the title: The seven deadly sins of chalga. Toward an anthropology of ethnomusic, Rozmary Statelova)

 
Turkish words and phrases
Pop music genres
Folk music genres